The 1826 Vermont gubernatorial election took place in September and October, and resulted in the election of Ezra Butler to a one-year term as governor.

The Vermont General Assembly met in Montpelier on October 12. The Vermont House of Representatives appointed a committee to review the votes of the freemen of Vermont for governor, lieutenant governor, treasurer, and members of the governor's council. The committee determined that Ezra Butler had won a one-year term. 

In the election for lieutenant governor, the committee determined that Democratic-Republican Aaron Leland had won election to a fifth one-year term. Newspapers of the time reported the vote totals as: Leland, 7,749 (61.9%); Henry Olin, 4,331 (34.7%); Scattering, 431 (3.4%).

Benjamin Swan had no opposition for election to a one-year term as treasurer, his twenty-seventh. Though he had nominally been a Federalist, Swan was usually endorsed by the Democratic-Republicans and even after the demise of the Federalist Party he was frequently unopposed.

The vote totals in the governor's race were reported as follows:

Results

References

Vermont gubernatorial elections
gubernatorial
Vermont